In organosulfur chemistry, a mesylate is any salt or ester of methanesulfonic acid. In salts, the mesylate is present as the   anion. When modifying the international nonproprietary name of a pharmaceutical substance containing the group or anion, the spelling used is sometimes mesilate (as in imatinib mesilate, the mesylate salt of imatinib).

Mesylate esters are a group of organic compounds that share a common functional group with the general structure , abbreviated , where R is an organic substituent. Mesylate is considered a leaving group in nucleophilic substitution reactions.

Preparation
Mesylates are generally prepared by treating an alcohol and methanesulfonyl chloride in the presence of a base, such as triethylamine.

Mesyl
Related to mesylate is the mesyl (Ms) or methanesulfonyl (CH3SO2) functional group. Methanesulfonyl chloride is often referred to as mesyl chloride. Whereas mesylates are often hydrolytically labile, mesyl groups, when attached to nitrogen, are resistant to hydrolysis. This functional group appears in a variety of medications, particularly cardiac (antiarrhythmic) drugs, as a sulfonamide moiety. Examples include sotalol, ibutilide, sematilide, dronedarone, dofetilide, E-4031, and bitopertin.

Natural occurrence
Ice core samples from a single spot in Antarctica were found to have tiny inclusions of magnesium methanesulfonate dodecahydrate. This natural phase is recognized as the mineral ernstburkeite. It is extremely rare.

See also
Tosylate
Triflate, the fluorinated analog of mesylate.

References

Leaving groups
Sulfonates